Landscape was a magazine of human geography founded by J.B. Jackson in 1951 and published three times a year in Berkeley, California until 1999.

The magazine's original subtitle was "Human Geography of the Southwest"; this was later dropped.

The first five issues consisted largely of Jackson's own essays. Jackson was the magazine's publisher and editor until 1968. Publication was suspended from 1971–1974.

Its ISSN was 0023-8023.

Notes

Human geography
Urban planning 
Landscape architecture

Magazines established in 1951
Defunct magazines published in the United States
Magazines published in California
Magazines disestablished in 1999
Triannual magazines published in the United States
Architecture magazines
Mass media in Berkeley, California